Jeckster Apinan is a Filipino professional player for the Batangas City Embassy Chill of the Maharlika Pilipinas Basketball League (MPBL). He was born and raised in Roxas City, Capiz. He played college ball for JRU Heavy Bombers before entering the Philippine Basketball Association.

References

1987 births
Filipino men's basketball players
Maharlika Pilipinas Basketball League players
People from Capiz
Living people
NLEX Road Warriors players
Terrafirma Dyip players
Small forwards
JRU Heavy Bombers basketball players